The term phrase structure grammar was originally introduced by Noam Chomsky as the term for grammar studied previously by Emil Post and Axel Thue (Post canonical systems). Some authors, however, reserve the term for more restricted grammars in the Chomsky hierarchy: context-sensitive grammars or context-free grammars. In a broader sense, phrase structure grammars are also known as constituency grammars. The defining trait of phrase structure grammars is thus their adherence to the constituency relation, as opposed to the dependency relation of dependency grammars.

Constituency relation
In linguistics, phrase structure grammars are all those grammars that are based on the constituency relation, as opposed to the dependency relation associated with dependency grammars; hence, phrase structure grammars are also known as constituency grammars.  Any of several related theories for the parsing of natural language qualify as constituency grammars, and most of them have been developed from Chomsky's work, including

 Government and binding theory
 Generalized phrase structure grammar
 Head-driven phrase structure grammar
 Lexical functional grammar
 The minimalist program
 Nanosyntax

Further grammar frameworks and formalisms also qualify as constituency-based, although they may not think of themselves as having spawned from Chomsky's work, e.g.

 Arc pair grammar, and
 Categorial grammar.

The fundamental trait that these frameworks all share is that they view sentence structure in terms of the constituency relation. The constituency relation derives from the subject-predicate division of Latin and Greek grammars that is based on term logic and reaches back to Aristotle in antiquity. Basic clause structure is understood in terms of a binary division of the clause into subject (noun phrase NP) and predicate (verb phrase VP).

The binary division of the clause results in a one-to-one-or-more correspondence. For each element in a sentence, there are one or more nodes in the tree structure that one assumes for that sentence. A two word sentence such as Luke laughed necessarily implies three (or more) nodes in the syntactic structure: one for the noun Luke (subject NP), one for the verb laughed (predicate VP), and one for the entirety Luke laughed (sentence S). The constituency grammars listed above all view sentence structure in terms of this one-to-one-or-more correspondence.

Dependency relation
By the time of Gottlob Frege, a competing understanding of the logic of sentences had arisen. Frege rejected the binary division of the sentence and replaced it with an understanding of sentence logic in terms of logical predicates and their arguments. On this alternative conception of sentence logic, the binary division of the clause into subject and predicate was not possible. It therefore opened the door to the dependency relation (although the dependency relation had also existed in a less obvious form in traditional grammars long before Frege). The dependency relation was first acknowledged concretely and developed as the basis for a comprehensive theory of syntax and grammar by Lucien Tesnière in his posthumously published work Éléments de syntaxe structurale (Elements of Structural Syntax).

The dependency relation is a one-to-one correspondence: for every element (word or morph) in a sentence, there is just one node in the syntactic structure. The distinction is thus a graph-theoretical distinction. The dependency relation restricts the number of nodes in the syntactic structure of a sentence to the exact number of syntactic units (usually words) that that sentence contains. Thus the two word sentence Luke laughed implies just two syntactic nodes, one for Luke and one for laughed. Some prominent dependency grammars are listed here:

 Functional generative description
 Lexicase
 Link grammar
 Meaning-text theory
 Operator grammar
 Recursive categorical syntax, sometimes called algebraic syntax
 Word grammar

Since these grammars are all based on the dependency relation, they are by definition NOT phrase structure grammars.

Non-descript grammars
Other grammars generally avoid attempts to group syntactic units into clusters in a manner that would allow classification in terms of the constituency vs. dependency distinction. In this respect, the following grammar frameworks do not come down solidly on either side of the dividing line:

 Cognitive grammar
 Construction grammar
 Stochastic grammar

See also
Catena

Notes

References

Allerton, D. 1979. Essentials of grammatical theory. London: Routledge & Kegan Paul.
Borsley, R. 1991. Syntactic theory: A unified approach. London: Edward Arnold.
Chomsky, Noam 1957. Syntactic structures. The Hague/Paris: Mouton.
Matthews, P. Syntax. 1981. Cambridge, UK: Cambridge University Press, .
McCawley, T. 1988. The syntactic phenomena of English, Vol. 1. Chicago: The University of Chicago Press.
Mel'cuk, I. 1988. Dependency syntax: Theory and practice. Albany: SUNY Press.
Sag, I. and T. Wasow. 1999. Syntactic theory: A formal introduction. Stanford, CA: CSLI Publications.
Tesnière, Lucien 1959. Éleménts de syntaxe structurale. Paris: Klincksieck.
van Valin, R. 2001. An introduction to syntax. Cambridge, UK: Cambridge University Press.

Generative syntax
Syntax
Noam Chomsky
Natural language processing